Hiram Bond Everest (April 11, 1830 – March 5, 1913) was an American businessman, investor, inventor and farmer.

Biography 

Hiram Bond Everest was born in Pike, New York on April 11, 1830. He moved to Wisconsin around age 18 to work as a teacher of science until 1853, when he moved to Rochester, New York. There he established a grocery business.

He married Mercy Eleanor Everest on January 1, 1852, and they had four children.

Later, with a business partner Matthew Ewing, the Vacuum Oil Company was incorporated in 1866, after obtaining a patent for a new method of distilling kerosene in a vacuum that produced a high-quality lubricant byproduct. It had been the company's intention to produce kerosene but they found a greater competitive advantage for their lubricants. Everest and the Vacuum Oil Company patented several inventions.  Everest subsequently leased  for the company in Oatka Valley, New York and was reputed to be a multi-millionaire. Everest died at age 82 in Los Angeles, California.

Diary excerpt

References

External links 
 
 "Hiram B. Everest and The Petroleum Industry", Historical Wyoming, July 1949, pp. 98-102

1831 births
1913 deaths
People from Pike, New York
American scientists